Una-Comandatuba Airport , is the airport serving Una, Brazil and particularly the Transamérica Resort located in Comandatuba Island.

It is owned by Hotéis Transamérica and operated by Socicam.

History
The airport was commissioned in 1977.

Airlines and destinations

Access

See also

List of airports in Brazil

References

External links

Airports in Bahia
Airports established in 1977